The 20,000 Martyrs of Nicomedia refers to victims of persecution of Christians in Nicomedia, Bithynia (modern Izmit, Turkey) by the Roman Emperors Diocletian and Maximian in the early 4th century AD.

According to various martyrologies and menologion, the persecution included the burning of a church that held numerous Christians on Christmas Day.

This event took place when the emperor Maximian (284-305) returned with victory over Ethiopians in 304 AD. It happened after they had refused to sacrifice to idols during Christmas Mass in order to thank gods for the victory he had acquired. Later Maximian and his soldiers entered the church and told the Christians they could escape punishment if they renounced Christ. The Christian priest Glycerius answered that the Christians would never "renounce their faith, even under the threat of torture". Maximian ordered him to be burned to death. Those who had not been burned in the church were captured and tortured to death. The bishop Anthimos who had escaped burning in the church was captured and beheaded.

The number 20,000 may be apocryphal. However, the martyrs of Nicomedia continue to be honored with feast days: they are commemorated on 28 December in the Eastern Orthodox Church, and by the Byzantine Catholic Churches. In the Roman Martyrology of the Catholic Church, there are separate entries for groups of martyrs of Nicomedia. The martyrdom of Anthimus of Nicomedia and companions is commemorated on 24 April and "the commemoration of many holy martyrs of Nicomedia" on June 23.

See also

Forty Martyrs of Sebaste
Ten thousand martyrs

References

Encyclopedia of Saints, Second Edition (2014). Publisher: Our Sunday Visitor; 2nd ed. edition (July 2, 2014),

External links
Orthodox Church in America, 28 December

Groups of Christian martyrs of the Roman era
Saints from Roman Anatolia
Date of birth unknown
4th-century Christian martyrs
4th-century Romans
4th-century deaths